Pimelea hewardiana, commonly known as forked rice-flower, is a species of flowering plant in the family Thymelaeaceae and is endemic to south-eastern continental Australia. It is a shrub with narrowly elliptic leaves and head-like clusters of 7 to 34 unisexual yellow flowers.

Description
The lower surface of the leaves is paler than the upper surface. Flowering mainly occurs from April to October.

Taxonomy
Pimelea hewardiana was first formally described in 1854 by Carl Meissner in the journal Linnaea. The specific epithet (hewardiana) honours the botanist, Robert Heward (1791–1877).

Distribution and habitat
Forked rice-flower grows in mallee shrubland, usually in rocky ground, from the Glenelg River to the Bacchus Marsh area, west of Melbourne. It was formerly found in south-eastern South Australia, but is now considered to be extinct in that state.

Conservation status
This species is listed as "rare" on the Department of Sustainability and Environment's Advisory List of Rare Or Threatened Plants In Victoria.

References

hewardiana
Flora of South Australia
Flora of Victoria (Australia)
Malvales of Australia
Plants described in 1854
Taxa named by Carl Meissner